Maksim Hukayla (born 16 October 1979) is a retired Belarusian professional footballer. His latest club was Granit Mikashevichi in 2012.

Honours
Shakhtyor Soligorsk
Belarusian Premier League champion: 2005
Belarusian Cup winner: 2003–04

External links

1979 births
Living people
Belarusian footballers
Belarusian Premier League players
FC Dinamo Minsk players
FC Naftan Novopolotsk players
FC Shakhtyor Soligorsk players
FC Vitebsk players
FC Granit Mikashevichi players
FC Dinamo-Juni Minsk players
Association football defenders